Facundo Pastor (born May 29, 1979) in Buenos Aires is an Argentine radio host.

Awards
 2013 Martín Fierro Awards: Best male journalist.

References

Argentine radio presenters
Argentine journalists
Living people
1979 births
People from Buenos Aires